The 1935 San Diego State Aztecs football team represented San Diego State College during the 1935 NCAA football season.

San Diego State competed in the Southern California Intercollegiate Athletic Conference (SCIAC). The 1935 San Diego State team was led by head coach Leo B. Calland in his first season with the Aztecs. They played home games at Balboa Stadium in San Diego, California and one game on campus. The Aztecs finished the season with three wins, four losses and one tie (3–4–1, 2–2–1 SCIAC). Overall, the team was outscored by its opponents 56–83 points for the season.

Schedule

Team players in the NFL
No San Diego State players were selected in the 1936 NFL Draft (the first year of the NFL draft).

Notes

References

San Diego State
San Diego State Aztecs football seasons
San Diego State Aztecs football